Meydan-e Jahad Metro Station is a station in line 3 of the Tehran Metro. It is located at the intersection of Valiasr Street and Fatemi Street. The station was planned to be named "Meydan-e Jahad" prior to opening, however, just one day after the official opening, the name was changed "Shohada-ye Resaneh for the first two months of its operation. However, due to popular complaints about the new name not being reflective of any nearby geographical feature, and the name being unfamiliar to most users, the name was reverted to the initially planned name. The name change cost the Metro Organization about 2 billion tomans.

References

Tehran Metro stations
Railway stations opened in 2015
2015 establishments in Iran